Đặng Tuyết Mai, also known as Madame Nguyễn Cao Kỳ (4 October 1941 – 21 December 2016) was the former wife of Nguyễn Cao Kỳ, former Republic of Vietnam Air Force commander and politician, who served as Prime Minister of South Vietnam from 1965 to 1967, and then as vice president until his retirement from politics in 1971.

Second Lady of South Vietnam (1967-1971)
Some sources have referred to Madame Đặng Tuyết Mai as the former First Lady of South Vietnam while others as the former second lady since her ex-husband's highest position in the former South Vietnam was vice president and not president (the prime minister's position was head of government but not head of state.) She was an Air Vietnam stewardess before she married General Ky, then the Chief of Staff of the Republic of Vietnam Air Force.

While her husband served as prime minister and vice president, she would travel around South Vietnam along with him wearing a military flight suit to show solidarity with the armed forces. In December 1966, she traveled to Tokyo's Jujin Hospital of Cosmetic Surgery, for surgery under the name of Miss Dang Tuyet Mai of South Vietnam, which was reported by Time magazine.

Her daughter, Kỳ Duyên, is a well-known personality in the overseas Vietnamese entertainment industry, usually in the role of MC for musical programs.

Exile and later life
Reunited, they went into exile in the United States, settling in California. She participated in some overseas art programs such as Asia Center and from ASIA 40 to ASIA 49, as a presenter. She later divorced Ky and moved back to Vietnam, where she managed the restaurant Phở Ta, which was located at District 3, Ho Chi Minh City. 

On 21 December 2016, she died at 5:00 a.m. at Hoag Hospital, Newport Beach, California. She was 75 years old. She is buried at the Westminster Memorial Park in Westminster, California.

References

External links
Madame Ky arranges a meeting with journalists in Saigon to interview her husband

1942 births
2016 deaths
People from Hanoi
Vietnamese people of the Vietnam War
Vietnamese anti-communists
Vietnamese emigrants to the United States
Women in the Vietnam War